Elana Meyer, OIS, (born 10 October 1966) is a South African long-distance runner who won the silver medal at the 1992 Summer Olympics in the 10,000 metres event.

Meyer set the 15 kilometres road running African record of 46:57 minutes in November 1991 in Cape Town. The record was equalled by Mestawet Tufa in 2008. The record was beaten by Tirunesh Dibaba in 2009, who posted a new world record of 46.28 minutes.

Meyer also held the half marathon African record (1:06:44 hours), set in January 1999 in Tokyo. The record was broken by Mary Keitany of Kenya at the 2009 IAAF World Half Marathon Championships by running the distance in 1:06:36 hours.

She was the gold medallist at the 1994 IAAF World Half Marathon Championships and set world records in that event in 1991, 1997, 1998, and 1999. She also had several good placings in top level marathon races.

References

External links 
 Official Elana Meyer website
 
 Profile Elana Meyer at southafrica.info

1966 births
Living people
People from Hessequa Local Municipality
South African female long-distance runners
South African female marathon runners
Olympic athletes of South Africa
Athletes (track and field) at the 1992 Summer Olympics
Athletes (track and field) at the 1996 Summer Olympics
Athletes (track and field) at the 2000 Summer Olympics
Medalists at the 1992 Summer Olympics
Commonwealth Games medallists in athletics
Commonwealth Games silver medallists for South Africa
Athletes (track and field) at the 1994 Commonwealth Games
World Athletics Half Marathon Championships winners
World record setters in athletics (track and field)
White South African people
World Athletics Championships athletes for South Africa
South African female cross country runners
Olympic silver medalists for South Africa
Olympic silver medalists in athletics (track and field)
African Games silver medalists for South Africa
African Games medalists in athletics (track and field)
Athletes (track and field) at the 1999 All-Africa Games
Medallists at the 1994 Commonwealth Games